Águeda is a city and a municipality in Portugal.

Águeda may also refer to:

People
Agueda Salazar Martinez (1898–2000), an American artist
Agueda Martinez: Our People, Our Country, a 1977 American short documentary film 
Agueda Amaral (born 1972), an East Timorese athlete
Águeda Dicancro, a Uruguayan sculptor 
Agueda Esteban (1868–1944), a Filipina revolutionary
Agueda Monasterio de Lattapiat (1776-1817), a heroines of the Chilean War of Independence
Agueda Kahabagan y Iniquinto (fl. 1896–1901), or Henerala Agueda, woman general of the Philippine army

Other uses
Águeda (river),  a tributary of the Douro river, Spain
Águeda (freguesia), a former civil parish in Águeda, Portugal
Águeda (telenovela), a Mexican TV program

See also
Aguada (disambiguation)
Castle of Santa Àgueda,  Ferreries, Menorca
Fort Santa Agueda, Guam